Terri-Amber Carlson (born 26 April 1990), is an association football player who has represented New Zealand at international level. She plays her club football with Glenfield Rovers.

Carlson was a member of the New Zealand U-20 side at the 2010 FIFA U-20 Women's World Cup, making just one appearance at the finals in Germany.

Carlson and Olivia Chance were the only two new caps included in the women's national team to contest the 2011 Cyprus Cup where she made her début as a substitute in a 2–1 win over to Switzerland in their second game on 4 March 2011.

References

External links

Carson, NZ Football profile

1990 births
Living people
New Zealand women's international footballers
New Zealand women's association footballers
Waterside Karori players
Women's association football forwards